XHCPAK-FM is a Mexican college radio station owned by the Instituto Campechano and located in Campeche, Campeche, Mexico.

History
The Instituto Campechano received a permit to build a new AM radio station, which began test transmissions on 1580 kHz in 1997. In 1998, the station moved to its final dial position of 810 kHz and took the call sign XEIC-AM. In 2013, Cofetel authorized XEIC-AM to move to the FM band as XHIC-FM 92.5, a 25,000-watt station.

The FM station launched in 2015, but the IC failed to make a necessary legal filing. The 2014  required all noncommercial radio stations, which held permits, to apply to have them switched to concessions, but no such filing was ever made, and as a result, the station lost legal authority to operate. To rectify this omission, a new station application was necessary; this was made on April 20, 2018, and the Federal Telecommunications Institute authorized a concession for XHCPAK-FM on 105.1 MHz, a Class A station with 3,000 watts, on April 1, 2020. Test broadcasts began in January 2022.

References

External links 
 

University radio stations in Mexico
Radio stations in Campeche
Mass media in Campeche City
Defunct radio stations in Mexico
Radio stations established in 1997
Radio stations disestablished in 2016
Radio stations established in 2022
1997 establishments in Mexico
2016 disestablishments in Mexico
2022 establishments in Mexico